The 1897 Ohio Wesleyan football team represented Ohio Wesleyan University as an independent during the 1897 college football season. The team compiled a record of 7–1–1, played Michigan to a scoreless tie, defeated Ohio State by a 6–0 score, shut out six of nine opponents, and outscored all opponents by a combined score of 144 to 32. Fielding H. Yost was the team's football coach and also played for the team at the tackle position.  The 1897 season was Yost's first as an intercollegiate football coach. Yost remained at Ohio Wesleyan only one year and later served as the football coach at Nebraska (1898), Kansas (1899), and Stanford (1900), before beginning a lengthy career as the head football coach at Michigan.

Schedule

Season summary

Michigan
On October 9, 1897, Ohio Wesleyan played Michigan to a scoreless tie in a game played in Ann Arbor, Michigan. The game was played in 15-minute halves. In addition to serving as coach, 26-year-old Fielding H. Yost was also the starting left tackle for Ohio Wesleyan. After the game, Michigan protested Ohio Wesleyan's decision to allow Yost, a paid coach and a non-student, to play in the game. Michigan asserted that Ohio Wesleyan had provided assurance that Yost would not play and introduced another individual as Yost. Michigan also charged that the Ohio Wesleyan team had engaged in "slugging and foul playing." One week after the game, Michigan announced that it would no longer schedule games against Ohio Wesleyan.

Oberlin
On October 16, 1897, Ohio Wesleyan sustained its only defeat of the season, losing to the team from Oberlin College in a game played in Oberlin, Ohio. Oberlin's coach was Samuel Huston Thompson.

Western Reserve
On October 30, 1897, Ohio Wesleyan defeated the team from Western Reserve University by a 10 to 6 score in a game played at Cleveland, Ohio. The key plays for Ohio Wesleyan were a blocked kick and two fumbles by Western Reserve.

Ohio State
On November 25, 1897, Ohio Wesleyan defeated the Ohio State football team by a 6-0 score in Columbus, Ohio. Breyfogle scored a touchdown for Ohio Wesleyan on a 70-yard run.

References

Ohio Wesleyan
Ohio Wesleyan Battling Bishops football seasons
Ohio Wesleyan football